Lucie Delarue-Mardrus  (3 November 1874 in Honfleur – 26 April 1945 ) was a French journalist, poet, novelist, sculptor, historian and designer.  She was a prolific writer, who produced more than 70 books in her lifetime.

In France, she is best known for her poem beginning with the line "L'odeur de mon pays était dans une pomme" ("In an apple I held the smell of my native land.") Her writings express her love of travel and her love for her native Normandy. L'Ex-voto (1932), for example, describes the life and milieu of the fishermen of Honfleur on the eve of the twentieth century.

She was married to the translator J. C. Mardrus from 1900 to 1915, but her primary sexual orientation was toward women. She was involved with several women throughout her lifetime, and she wrote extensively of lesbian love.

In 1902-03 she wrote a series of love poems to the American writer and salon hostess Natalie Clifford Barney, published posthumously in 1957 as Nos secrètes amours (Our Secret Loves).  She also depicted Barney in her 1930 novel, L'Ange et les Pervers (The Angel and the Perverts), in which she said she "analyzed and described Natalie at length as well as the life into which she initiated me".

The protagonist of the novel is a hermaphrodite named Marion who lives a double life, frequenting literary salons in female dress, then changing from skirt to trousers to attend gay soirées. Barney appears as "Laurette Wells", a salon hostess who spends much of the novel trying to win back an ex-lover, loosely based on Barney's real-life attempts at regaining her relationship with her former lover, Renée Vivien.

She was awarded the first Renée Vivien prize for women poets in 1936.

One admirer wrote to describe Lucie Delarue-Mardrus, stating in part;

"She is adorable. She sculpts, mounts to horse, loves a woman, then another, and yet another. She was able to free herself from her husband and has never embarked on a second marriage or the conquest of another man."

Notes

References

 Livia, Anna(1995). "Introduction: Lucie Delarue-Mardrus and the Phrenetic Harlequinade."  
 
Lucie Delarue-Mardus

1874 births
1945 deaths
French women novelists
French lesbian writers
People from Honfleur
French LGBT novelists
French LGBT poets
20th-century French poets
French women poets
20th-century French novelists
20th-century French women writers